Abandoned & Little-Known Airfields  is an online database detailing information and first hand memories about airports in the United States which are no longer in operation, or are rarely used.

The website was started by Paul Freeman in 1999 as he had developed an interest on the subject. In 2015, there were over 2,000 airports chronicled on the site and it had been viewed over 1.7 million times. Freeman continues to edit the site along with a small team of "airfield archeologists" who do primary source research using old aeronautical charts, directories and related publications. Frequent contributors on the site include Phil Beutel, K.O. Eckland, Christopher Freeze, Chris Kennedy, Bill Larkins, Ron Plante, Brian Rehwinkel, Dann Shively, John Voss, Walter Wells, Jonathan Westerling and the late David Brooks.  In the US, airports close at about a rate of one per week.

References

Notes

Bibliography

External links

Online databases
Defunct airports in the United States
Internet properties established in 1999
Databases in the United States
1999 establishments in the United States